Durand of Gloucester (d. circa 1096) was Sheriff of Gloucestershire in 1086 and was one of the tenants-in-chief of King William the Conqueror in Gloucestershire and elsewhere, with a total of 63 holding listed in the Domesday Book of 1086.

Biography
He was the heir of his brother Roger de Pitres (d. pre-1083), Sheriff of Gloucestershire from about 1071. He died in about 1096 when his heir became his nephew (Roger's son) Walter of Gloucester (died 1129), hereditary Sheriff of Gloucestershire in 1097 and in 1105–6, and Castellan of Gloucester Castle (also seemingly Constable of England under King Henry I (1100–1135))

Walter's son was Miles FitzWalter of Gloucester, 1st Earl of Hereford (died 1143) (alias Miles of Gloucester), a great magnate based in the west of England, hereditary Constable of England and Sheriff of Gloucestershire. Miles inherited vast landholdings in Wales from his wife Sibyl de Neufmarché, daughter and heiress of Bernard de Neufmarché (died 1125), Lord of Brecon, and acquired others himself, but the nucleus of his feudal barony (known as the "Barony of Miles of Gloucester") was the fiefdom of his great-uncle Durand of Gloucester.

Both Durand and his brother Roger de Pitres were buried in Gloucester Abbey (St. Peter's Abbey) in Gloucester (since 1541 Gloucester Cathedral).

Sources

References

1096 deaths
Domesday Book tenants-in-chief